The Langkawi Island bent-toed gecko (Cyrtodactylus langkawiensis) is a species of gecko that is endemic to Langkawi Island in Malaysia.

References 

Cyrtodactylus
Reptiles described in 2012